The Seikilos epitaph is the oldest surviving complete musical composition, including musical notation, from anywhere in the world. The epitaph has been variously dated, but seems to be either from the 1st or the 2nd century CE. The song, the melody of which is recorded, alongside its lyrics, in the ancient Greek musical notation, was found engraved on a tombstone (a stele) from the Hellenistic town of Tralles near present-day Aydın, Turkey, not far from Ephesus. It is a Hellenistic Ionic song in either the Phrygian octave species or Iastian tonos. While older music with notation exists (for example the Hurrian songs), all of it is in fragments; the Seikilos epitaph is unique in that it is a complete, though short, composition.

Inscription text and lyrics

The following is the Greek text found on the tombstone (in the later polytonic script; the original is in majuscule), along with a transliteration of the words which are sung to the melody, and a somewhat free English translation thereof; this excludes the musical notation:

 sỳ lypoû 
While you live, shine
have no grief at all
life exists only for a short while
and Time demands his due.

Dedication
The last two surviving words on the tombstone itself are (with the bracketed characters denoting a partial possible reconstruction of the lacuna or of a possible name abbreviation)  meaning "Seikilos to Euterpe"; hence, according to this reconstruction, the tombstone and the epigrams thereon were possibly dedicated by Seikilos to Euterpe, who was possibly his wife. (Euterpe is also the name of the Muse of music).

Another possible partial reconstruction could be  meaning "Seikilos of Euterpes", i.e. "Seikilos, son of Euterpes".

Indication
The tombstone has an inscription on it, which reads in Greek:

A free translation of this reads: "I am a tombstone, an image. Seikilos placed me here as a long-lasting sign of deathless remembrance."

Melody

Transcription
The inscription above each line of the lyrics (transcribed here in polytonic script), consists of letters and signs indicating the melody of the song:

Scholarly views

Although the transcription of the melody is unproblematic, there is some disagreement about the nature of the melodic material itself. There are no modulations, and the notation is clearly in the diatonic genus, but while it is described by Thomas J. Mathiesen and Jon Solomon on the one hand as being clearly in the diatonic Iastian tonos, Mathiesen also says it would "fit perfectly" within Ptolemy's Phrygian tonos, since, according to Jon Solomon, the arrangement of the tones (1 ½ 1 1 1 ½ 1 [ascending]) "is that of the Phrygian species" according to Cleonides. R. P. Winnington-Ingram says "The scale employed is the diatonic octave from e to e (in two sharps). The tonic seems to be a; the cadence is a f e. This piece is … [in] Phrygic (the D mode) with its tonic in the same relative position as that of the Doric." Yet Claude Palisca explains that the difficulty lies in the fact that "the harmoniai had no finals, dominants, or internal relationships that would establish a hierarchy of tensions and points of rest, although the mese ('middle note') may have had a gravitational function". Although the epitaph's melody is "clearly structured around a single octave, … the melody emphasizes the mese by position … rather than the mese by function". Moreover, Charles Cosgrove, building on West, shows that although the notes correspond to the Phrygian octave species, analyzing the song on the assumption that its orientation notes are the standing notes of a set of disjunct tetrachords forming the Phrygian octave species does not sufficiently illumine the melody's tonal structure. The song's pitch centers (notes of emphasis according to frequency, duration, and placement) are, in Greek notational nomenclature, C and Z, which correspond to G and D if the scale is mapped on the white keys of the piano (A and E in the "two sharps" transcription above). These two pitches are mese and nete diezeugmenon of the octave species, but the two other standing notes of that scale's tetrachords (hypate and paramese) do not come into play in significant ways as pitch centers, whether individually or together in intervals forming fourths. The melody is dominated by fifths and thirds; and although the piece ends on hypate, that is the only occurrence of this note. This instance of hypate probably derives its suitability as a final by virtue of being "the same," through octave equivalency, as nete diezeugmenon, the pitch center Z.

Date
The find has been variously dated, but the first or second century CE is the most probable guess. One authority states that on grounds of paleography the inscription can be "securely dated to the first century C.E.", while on the same basis (the use of swallow-tail serifs, the almost triangular Φ with prolongation below, ligatures between N, H, and M, and above all the peculiar form of the letter omega) another is equally certain it dates from the second century CE, and makes comparisons to dated inscriptions of 127/8 and 149/50 CE.

History of the stele's discovery and exhibition 

The Epitaph was discovered in 1883 by Sir W. M. Ramsay in Tralleis, a small town near Aydın, Turkey. According to one source the stele was then lost and rediscovered in Smyrna in 1922, at about the end of the Greco-Turkish War of 1919–1922. According to another source the stele, having first been discovered during the building of the railway next to Aydın, had first remained in the possession of the building firm's director, Edward Purser, where Ramsay found and published about it; in about 1893, as it "was broken at the bottom, its base was sawn off straight so that it could stand and serve as a pedestal for Mrs Purser's flowerpots"; this caused the loss of one line of text, i.e., while the stele would now stand upright, the grinding had obliterated the last line of the inscription. The stele next passed to Edward Purser's son-in-law, Mr Young, who kept it in Buca, Smyrna. It remained there until the defeat of the Greeks, having been taken by the Dutch Consul for safe keeping during the war; the Consul's son-in-law later brought it by way of Constantinople and Stockholm to The Hague; it remained there until 1966, when it was acquired by the Department of Antiquities of the National Museum of Denmark in Copenhagen. This is where the stele has been located since (inventory number: 14897).

Word accent

A German scholar Otto Crusius in 1893, shortly after the publication of this inscription, was the first to observe that the music of this song as well as that of the hymns of Mesomedes tends to follow the pitch of the word accents. The publication of the two Delphic hymns in the same year confirmed this tendency.

One word which does not conform is the first word  , where the music has a low note despite the acute accent. There are other places also where the initial syllable of a clause starts on a low note in the music.

Another apparently anomalous word is   'is', where the music has a higher pitch on the first syllable. However, there exists a second pronunciation  , which is used "when the word expresses existence or possibility (i.e. when it is translatable with expressions such as 'exists', 'there is', or 'it is possible')", which is evidently the meaning here.

Stigmai
The musical notation has certain dots above it, called stigmai, singular stigmē, which are also found in certain other fragments of Greek music, such as the fragment from Euripides' Orestes. The meaning of these is still uncertain. According to an ancient source (known as the Anonymus Bellermanni), they represent an 'arsis', which has been taken to mean a kind of 'upbeat' ('arsis' means 'raising' in Greek); Armand D'Angour argues, however, that this does not rule out the possibility of a dynamic stress. Another view, by Solomon, is that the stigmai "signify a rhythmical emphasis". According to Mathiesen,

A stigme appears on all the syllables of the second half of each bar as it is printed above (for example on ). If the Anonymus Bellermanni source is correct, this implies that whole of the first half of each double-foot bar or measure is the thesis, and the whole of the second half is the arsis. Stefan Hagel, however, argues that this does not preclude the possibility that within the thesis and arsis there was a further hierarchy of strong and weak notes.

An alternative rhythmization
A possible alternative way of rhythmizing the Seikilos song, in order to preserve the iambic ('rising', di-dum) feel of the rhythm, was suggested by Armand D'Angour, with the barlines displaced one quaver to the right, as in the following transcription:

Stefan Hagel, discussing an example in the Anonymus Bellermanni, suggests the possibility of a similar transcription with displaced barlines of a line of music with this same rhythm. This hypothesis is however based on an unfounded assumption about ancient rhythmical theory and practice, namely that "the regular iambic environment precluded accented shorts altogether; in other words, the accent of the iambic foot fell on its long". This assumption is however contradicted by ancient rhythmical theory and practice.

Tosca Lynch notes that the song in its conventional transcription corresponds to the rhythm referred to by ancient Greek rhythmicians as an "iambic dactyl" (  (using the term "dactyl" in the rhythmicians' sense of a foot in which the two parts are of equal length) (cf. Aristides Quintilianus 38.5–6). According to this, the whole of the first half of each bar (e.g.  ) is the thesis, and the whole of the second, as the stigmai imply, is the arsis. Therefore, in Lynch's opinion the conventional transcription is to be preferred as it accurately reflects the original rhythm.

In popular culture
For the 1951 film Quo Vadis, Miklos Rosza drew inspiration from Ancient Greco-Roman music and instruments.
Nero (Peter Ustinov) is shown composing and singing a melody based in the Seikilos epitaph.
The English lyrics however are by H. Gray.

The melody has been featured in the soundtrack of the video game Civilization VI. The lyrics of the epitaph address a living listener, which may account for the theme appearing in the information era stage of the game; this game stage corresponds to the time at which the game's players live.

References

Notes

Citations

Bibliography

External links
 
  "Skolion of Seikilos", The Session.
 RM recording of the Seikilos song, text accompanied by lyre (download)
 Arrangement for organ of the Seikilos song (video and score)
 Another version of the song for lyre and voice recorded for Classic FM

Ancient Greek music inscriptions
Ancient Greek music
Skolia
Steles in Turkey
1st-century inscriptions
2nd-century inscriptions
1883 archaeological discoveries
History of Aydın
National Museum of Denmark